The Leuven Lions are an American football team based in Leuven. The Lions are currently members of the Flemish American Football League (FAFL) conference in the Belgian Football League (BFL).

History

2004 season

2004 Playoffs

2005-2010

2011 season

2012 season

2013 season

2014 season

Statistics

Performance (2000-2011)
This is an overview of the performance of the Lions against the teams in the FFL during the BFL regular and post seasons from 2000 until 2011.

Achievements
Overview achievements BFL Teams

References

External links
 website Lions

American football teams in Belgium
1986 establishments in Belgium
American football teams established in 1986